Christoph Helmchen is a German neurologist at University of Lübeck and Ig Nobel Prize winner of 2016 in medicine. Helmchen and colleagues have discovered that if anyone has an itch on the left side of his body, they can relieve it by looking into a mirror and scratching the right side of their body (and vice versa).

Helmchen was born in Marburg, Germany. He studied medicine at the University of Marburg and went on to complete his medical doctorate in 1992. He then completed a research fellowship in neuroscience at the Max Planck Institute for Brain Research in Frankfurt, and subsequently worked at the University of California, Berkeley.

See also
 List of Ig Nobel Prize winners
 Itch

References

Year of birth missing (living people)
Living people
German neurologists